Sandra Zidani (or Zidani) (born 12 September 1968) is a Belgian comedian, actress, humorist and former Protestant religious professor.

Biography
Zidani is of Algerian origin through her father, while her mother is Belgian, of Walloon origin.
She started on stage at the age of nine. She has a degree in art history from the Université libre de Bruxelles.

One-woman show
 1993-1996 : La petite comique de la famille
 1998 : Mon légionnaire, directed by Martine Willequet
 1999 : Et ta sœur !?, directed by Patrick Chaboud
 2002 : Va-t'en savoir !, directed by Patrick Chaboud
 2004 : Journal intime d’un sex sans bol, directed by Zidani
 2007 : Fabuleuse étoile, directed by Zidani and Patrick Chaboud
 2008 : Zida Diva, with the band "Fortissimo"
 2009-2011 : Moudawana Forever, with Ben Hamidou
 2011-2012 : Mélopolis
 2013 : Zidani fait son cirque, in the Cirque royal
 2010-2014 : Retour en Algérie, directed by Zidani
 2011-2014 : La rentrée d'Arlette, directed by Zidani and Patrick Chaboud
 2013-2015 : Quiche toujours

Theater
 2016 : Welcome à Saint Tropez, directed by Rémi Rosello

Television
 2000-2003 : "Les Coups d'humour", TF1
 2005-2006 : "Si c'était vous", RTL-TVI
 2006-2007 : "Cinquante Degrés Nord", Arte
 2008 : "Pliés en 4", France 4
 2012 : "Fashion Express", Star TV
 2012 : "Face à face", RTL-TVI
 2012 : "Sans Chichis", La Deux
 2012 : "Rire contre le racisme", La Deux
 2013 : "Signé Taloche", RTBF
 2012-2014 : "On n'demande qu'à en rire", France 2

Filmography

Radio
 2012 : La Première, "On n'est pas rentré !"
 2012 : La Première, "Et Dieu dans tout ça?"

Awards
 1993 : Festival Francofourires Charleroi : Press prize
 1993 : Festival de Lobbes : Jury prize and Press prize
 1995 : Festival de Super Dévoluy : RTL TVI Winner
 1996 : Festival de Bruxelles : Jury prize and Public prize
 1996 : Festival du rire à Laval : Special jury prize

References

External links

1968 births
Living people
Actresses from Brussels
Belgian film actresses
Belgian people of Algerian descent